The Trial of Mary Dugan is a 1929 American pre-Code film produced and distributed by Metro-Goldwyn-Mayer and starring Norma Shearer. The film is based on the 1927 Broadway stage play The Trial of Mary Dugan by Bayard Veiller, who also directed the film. On stage the play had starred Ann Harding (in Shearer's role), who would come to Hollywood a few years later at the beginning of talkies. This was Veiller's first and only sound film directorial effort as he had directed several silent films before 1922. The play was also published as a novel authored by William Almon Wolff, published in 1928. The 1941 film of the same name is an MGM remake.

Plot
Mary Dugan, a Broadway showgirl, is charged with murder in the knifing death of her wealthy lover, and goes on trial for her life. When her defense counsel appears to bungle his job, Mary's brother Jimmy, a newly licensed attorney, jumps into the case to defend his sister. Jimmy's courtroom style is unconventional, but he seems to be holding his own against the prosecuting attorney... until a surprise testimony changes the course of the trial.

Cast
Norma Shearer as Mary Dugan
Lewis Stone as Edward West
H. B. Warner as District Attorney Galway
Raymond Hackett as Jimmy Dugan
Lilyan Tashman as Dagmar Lorne
Olive Tell as Mrs. Gertrude Rice
Adrienne D'Ambricourt as Marie Ducrot
DeWitt Jennings as Inspector Hunt
Wilfrid North as Judge Nash
Landers Stevens as Dr. Welcome
Mary Doran as Pauline Agguerro
Westcott Clarke as Captain Price
Charles R. Moore as James Madison
Claud Allister as Henry James Plaisted
Myra Hampton as May Harris

Cast notes:
 Thomas A. Curran, an early American silent film actor, had an uncredited bit part.

References

External links
The Trial of Mary Dugan at IMDb.com
The Trial of Mary Dugan ; allrovi.com/ synopsis
scaled version of lobby poster
large lobby poster The Trial of Mary Dugan

1929 films
American films based on plays
Metro-Goldwyn-Mayer films
American black-and-white films
1929 drama films
1920s English-language films
1920s American films